Pekin Community School District is a rural public school district headquartered in Pekin, an unincorporated area in Jefferson County, Iowa, near Packwood.

It serves the following incorporated communities in Jefferson, Keokuk, Wapello, and Washington counties: Packwood, Hedrick, Martinsburg, Ollie, and Richland. Unincorporated areas served by Pekin schools, aside from Pekin, include Abington, Highland Center, and Rubio.

History

The school facilities were built on a former runway that was once used to train pilots.

In 1986 there was a proposal to merge the Pekin district and the Hedrick Community School District. By 1990 Iowa law allowed students to attend schools in other school districts, but at the time students had to pay tuition there. Hedrick sued the Pekin district over accepting students for free that should have been counted as out of district, as they lived with Pekin district-resident family members or friends of their family but not with their primary caregivers. A jury decided that the Hedrick district was damaged by this. The law was later modified so that a student can attend another school district for free.

In 1991, the district incorporated territory from the former Hedrick district after that district closed. The expected enrollment for all Pekin schools combined for fall 1991 was 800 students. A draft of a state proposal to merge much of Hedrick into Pekin anticipated that Pekin would take in about 85% of the Hedrick students.

In 2016, the district agreed to begin a superintendent-sharing arrangement with the Sigourney Community School District.

The district proposed a $55 million bond in 2017.

Schools
The district operates two schools in a single facility near Pekin:
 Pekin Elementary School
 Pekin Community Junior/Senior High School

Pekin Community High School

Athletics
The Panthers compete in the Southeast Iowa Superconference in the following sports:
Cross Country
 Boys' 2-time Class B State Champions (1967, 1968)
 Girls' 3-time Class 1A State Champions (2008, 2010, 2011)
Volleyball
Football
10-time Class 1A State Champions (1970, 1981, 1982, 1983, 1998, 1999, 2004, 2006, 2009, 2014)
Wrestling
Basketball
Track and Field
 Boys'1979 Class B State Champions
Baseball
Softball

Student body
In early 1991 the district had about 576 students. Early that year 32 children who lived in the boundaries of the Hedrick school district attended school in the Pekin school district, prior to the absorbing of much of the Hedrick district.

See also
List of school districts in Iowa
List of high schools in Iowa

References

External links
 Pekin Community School District
 

School districts in Iowa
Education in Jefferson County, Iowa
Education in Keokuk County, Iowa
Education in Wapello County, Iowa
Education in Washington County, Iowa